František Černík (born 3 June 1953 in Nový Jičín, Czechoslovakia) is a Czechoslovakian former ice hockey player. Most of his career was spent in the Czechoslovak First Ice Hockey League with TJ Vítkovice, where he played from 1978 to 1984. He also spent the 1984–85 season with the Detroit Red Wings of the National Hockey League, and three subsequent years split between Germany and Austria, before retiring in 1989. After his playing career finished Černík became general manager of TJ Vítkovice, holding that position until 2004. He became president of the club in 2004, a position he held until 2011, and purchased majority control of the club in 2005, owning it until 2016. He was again named president in 2017. Internationally Černík represented the Czechoslovakian national team at several tournaments, including multiple World Championships, two Canada Cups, and the 1984 Winter Olympics, where he won a silver medal.

Career statistics

Regular season and playoffs

International

External links
 

1953 births
Living people
ATSE Graz players
Czechoslovak expatriate sportspeople in Austria
Czech ice hockey right wingers
Czechoslovak ice hockey right wingers
Detroit Red Wings players
HC Dukla Jihlava players
HC Vítkovice players
Ice hockey players at the 1984 Winter Olympics
Medalists at the 1984 Winter Olympics
Olympic medalists in ice hockey
Olympic silver medalists for Czechoslovakia
Sportspeople from Nový Jičín
Undrafted National Hockey League players
Czechoslovak expatriate sportspeople in the United States
Expatriate ice hockey players in the United States
Expatriate ice hockey players in Austria
Czechoslovak expatriate ice hockey people
Czechoslovak expatriate sportspeople in West Germany
Expatriate ice hockey players in West Germany
Czechoslovakia (WHA) players